Apradhi Kaun may refer to:
 Apradhi Kaun? (1957 film), directed by Asit Sen
 Apradhi Kaun!, a 1981 TV series starring Kavita Chaudhary
 Apradhi Kaun? (1982 film)